Karen Cox is a British Registered Nurse and academic. She is currently the Vice Chancellor of University of Kent.  She was a Professor of Cancer and Palliative Care, and Deputy Vice-Chancellor of the University of Nottingham. She was one of the main drivers behind the  'Project Transform' there, which was highly controversial and led to a public apology of the university to its staff. Since 1 August 2017, she has served as the sixth Vice-Chancellor of the University of Kent.

References

Year of birth missing (living people)
Living people
Academics of the University of Nottingham
Vice-Chancellors of the University of Kent
Alumni of King's College London
English nurses
Women academic administrators